Bergenfield is a borough in Bergen County, in the U.S. state of New Jersey. As of the 2020 United States census, the borough's population was 28,321, an increase of 1,557 (+5.8%) from the 2010 census count of 26,764, which in turn reflected an increase of 517 (+2.0%) from the 26,247 counted in the 2000 census.

Bergenfield was formed on the basis of a referendum held on June 25, 1894, from portions of Englewood Township and Palisades Township. The borough was formed during the "Boroughitis" phenomenon then sweeping through Bergen County, in which 26 boroughs were formed in the county in 1894 alone. The borough was named for its location in Bergen County.

New Jersey Monthly magazine ranked Bergenfield as its 211th best place to live in its 2010 rankings of the "Best Places To Live" in New Jersey. The magazine ranked Bergenfield as its 231st best place to live in its 2008 rankings of the "Best Places To Live".

NeighborhoodScout named Bergenfield as the safest municipality in the nation in 2012 with more than 25,000 residents and in both 2013 and 2014 they named it as the 2nd safest town in the USA only behind Franklin, Massachusetts.
In 2019, Bergenfield has dropped in their ratings, falling to number 4.

Geography
According to the United States Census Bureau, the borough had a total area of 2.91 square miles (7.55 km2), including 2.90 square miles (7.52 km2) of land and 0.01 square miles (0.02 km2) of water (0.31%).

The borough borders the Bergen County municipalities of Cresskill, Dumont, Englewood, New Milford, Teaneck and Tenafly.

Demographics

 

Bergenfield has been called the Little Manila of Bergen County. Of the 14,224 Filipino population in the county as a whole enumerated in the 2000 Census, 3,133 (22% of the county total) lived in Bergenfield. By the 2010 Census, 4,569 Bergenfield residents (17.1% of the population) listed themselves as being of Filipino ancestry, and increasing further to 5,062 (18.4%) by 2016.

2010 census

The Census Bureau's 2006–2010 American Community Survey showed that (in 2010 inflation-adjusted dollars) median household income was $82,546 (with a margin of error of +/− $6,568) and the median family income was $99,963 (+/− $5,602). Males had a median income of $52,891 (+/− $2,058) versus $50,443 (+/− $2,598) for females. The per capita income for the borough was $35,034 (+/− $2,133). About 3.9% of families and 5.7% of the population were below the poverty line, including 7.2% of those under age 18 and 7.1% of those age 65 or over.

Same-sex couples headed 62 households in 2010, an increase from the 51 counted in 2000.

2000 census
As of the 2000 United States census there were 26,247 people, 8,981 households, and 6,753 families residing in the borough. The population density was 9,065.4 people per square mile (3,494.5/km2). There were 9,147 housing units at an average density of 3,159.3 per square mile (1,217.8/km2). The racial makeup of the borough was 62.90% White, 6.90% African American, 0.24% Native American, 20.41% Asian (5,357 Asian), 0.02% Pacific Islander, 6.47% from other races, and 3.06% from two or more races. Hispanic or Latino of any race were 17.05% of the population.

There were 8,981 households, out of which 36.4% had children under the age of 18 living with them, 59.8% were married couples living together, 11.8% had a female householder with no husband present, and 24.8% were non-families. 20.8% of all households were made up of individuals, and 9.9% had someone living alone who was 65 years of age or older. The average household size was 2.92 and the average family size was 3.41.

In the borough the population was spread out, with 24.8% under the age of 18, 7.3% from 18 to 24, 31.0% from 25 to 44, 23.2% from 45 to 64, and 13.5% who were 65 years of age or older. The median age was 38 years. For every 100 females, there were 91.4 males. For every 100 females age 18 and over, there were 88.2 males.

The median income for a household in the borough was $62,172, and the median income for a family was $71,187. Males had a median income of $42,074 versus $35,137 for females. The per capita income for the borough was $24,706. About 2.6% of families and 3.5% of the population were below the poverty line, including 2.6% of those under age 18 and 3.8% of those age 65 or over.

Economy
Prestige Records, a major producer of jazz recordings that was established in 1949, had its offices in Bergenfield from the mid-1960s until its sale in 1972.

Arts and culture
The infamous group suicide of the "Bergenfield Four" took place in March 1987 and received worldwide attention. The victims were four local high schoolers, ages sixteen to nineteen, and their mutual deaths by carbon monoxide were followed by a rash of copycat attempts. The suicides are examined in sociological perspective in Donna Gaines' Teenage Wasteland (1998). References in the arts include the Tom Russell song "Bergenfield" (1989), and the Alice Donut song "New Jersey Exit" (1988).

The Royal Teens were a 1950s rock and roll band from the borough that was best known as one-hit wonders for their song "Short Shorts". The Knickerbockers were a 1960s band that took their name from Knickerbocker Road in nearby Tenafly. Mucky Pup was a hardcore and heavy metal band from Bergenfield.

Several scenes for the Harlem Globetrotter 1954 film Go, Man, Go! were filmed at Franklin School, and along nearby Prospect Avenue. Those scenes included actors Dane Clark (portraying Abe Saperstein) and Patricia Breslin (playing Sylvia Saperstein). Many of the school's 5th grade boys were used as extras.

On May 4, 2006, the ABC show Extreme Makeover: Home Edition came to Bergenfield to build a home for the Llanes family on New Bridge Road. The episode aired as the pre-season two-hour special originally broadcast on September 17, 2006. The Llanes sold their home in 2012 and went to live with relatives because their taxes increased beyond their ability to pay, having risen from under $6,500 in 2007 to more than $15,000 five years later due to the increased assessed value of the home following the renovation.

Sports
On July 22, 2007, the Team Bergenfield Roller Hockey Club, won the NARCh National Roller Hockey Championship defeating the Nor-Cal Patriots 6–5 in Estero, Florida. Team Bergenfield went 6–0–1 in the tournament en route to winning the Men's Silver Championship. The team formed in Bergenfield in 1994 and is one of the longest running roller hockey clubs in the United States.

Government

Local government
Bergenfield is governed under the Borough form of New Jersey municipal government, which is used in 218 municipalities (of the 564) statewide, making it the most common form of government in New Jersey. The governing body is comprised of a Mayor and a Borough Council, with all positions elected at-large on a partisan basis as part of the November general election. A Mayor is elected directly by the voters to a four-year term of office. The Borough Council is comprised of six members elected to serve three-year terms on a staggered basis, with two seats coming up for election each year in a three-year cycle. The Borough form of government used by Bergenfield is a "weak mayor / strong council" government in which council members act as the legislative body with the mayor presiding at meetings and voting only in the event of a tie. The mayor can veto ordinances subject to an override by a two-thirds majority vote of the council. The mayor makes committee and liaison assignments for council members, and most appointments are made by the mayor with the advice and consent of the council.

, the mayor of Bergenfield is Democrat Arvin Amatorio, whose term of office ends December 31, 2023; a former borough council member, Amatorio narrowly unseated Republican Norman Schmelz in the 2019 election. Members of the Borough Council are Council President Marc Pascual (D, 2023), Salvador S. "Buddy" Deauna (D, 2025), Ora C. Kornbluth (D, 2025), Thomas A. Lodato (D, 2024), Rafael Marte (D, 2023) and Hernando D. Rivera Mejia (D, 2024).

In January 2020, the Borough Council selected Marc Pascual to fill the seat expiring in December 2020 that had been held by Arvin Amatorio until he steeped down to take office as mayor.

In January 2017, the borough council selected Rafael Marte to fill the seat expiring in December 2017 that had been held by Chris Tully until he resigned from office earlier that month.

Federal, state and county representation
Bergenfield is located in the 5th Congressional District and is part of New Jersey's 38th state legislative district. Prior to the 2011 reapportionment following the 2010 Census, Bergenfield had been in the 37th state legislative district.

Politics
As of March 2011, there were a total of 14,083 registered voters in Bergenfield, of which 5,139 (36.5% vs. 31.7% countywide) were registered as Democrats, 2,151 (15.3% vs. 21.1%) were registered as Republicans and 6,782 (48.2% vs. 47.1%) were registered as Unaffiliated. There were 11 voters registered as Libertarians or Greens. Among the borough's 2010 Census population, 52.6% (vs. 57.1% in Bergen County) were registered to vote, including 69.2% of those ages 18 and over (vs. 73.7% countywide).

In the 2016 presidential election, Democrat Hillary Clinton received 7,395 votes (63.4% vs. 54.2% countywide), ahead of Republican Donald Trump with 3,745 votes (32.1% vs. 41.1% countywide) and other candidates with 305 votes (2.6% vs. 3.0% countywide), among the 11,653 ballots cast by the borough's 16,298 registered voters for a turnout of 71.5% (vs. 73% in Bergen County). In the 2012 presidential election, Democrat Barack Obama received 6,665 votes (62.7% vs. 54.8% countywide), ahead of Republican Mitt Romney with 3,773 votes (35.5% vs. 43.5%) and other candidates with 91 votes (0.9% vs. 0.9%), among the 10,624 ballots cast by the borough's 15,285 registered voters, for a turnout of 69.5% (vs. 70.4% in Bergen County). In the 2008 presidential election, Democrat Barack Obama received 6,410 votes (57.6% vs. 53.9% countywide), ahead of Republican John McCain with 4,561 votes (40.9% vs. 44.5%) and other candidates with 70 votes (0.6% vs. 0.8%), among the 11,138 ballots cast by the borough's 14,721 registered voters, for a turnout of 75.7% (vs. 76.8% in Bergen County). In the 2004 presidential election, Democrat John Kerry received 5,768 votes (54.8% vs. 51.7% countywide), ahead of Republican George W. Bush with 4,657 votes (44.3% vs. 47.2%) and other candidates with 57 votes (0.5% vs. 0.7%), among the 10,523 ballots cast by the borough's 13,954 registered voters, for a turnout of 75.4% (vs. 76.9% in the whole county).

In the 2017 gubernatorial election, Democrat Phil Murphy received 66.5% of the vote (3,822 cast), ahead of Republican Kim Guadagno with 32.3% (1,858 votes), and other candidates with 1.1% (65 votes), among the 5,891 ballots cast by the borough's 15,631 registered voters (146 ballots were spoiled), for a turnout of 37.7%. In the 2013 gubernatorial election, Republican Chris Christie received 59.2% of the vote (3,576 cast), ahead of Democrat Barbara Buono with 40.0% (2,416 votes), and other candidates with 0.8% (47 votes), among the 6,214 ballots cast by the borough's 14,629 registered voters (175 ballots were spoiled), for a turnout of 42.5%. In the 2009 gubernatorial election, Democrat Jon Corzine received 3,463 ballots cast (53.9% vs. 48.0% countywide), ahead of Republican Chris Christie with 2,599 votes (40.5% vs. 45.8%), Independent Chris Daggett with 276 votes (4.3% vs. 4.7%) and other candidates with 29 votes (0.5% vs. 0.5%), among the 6,420 ballots cast by the borough's 14,488 registered voters, yielding a 44.3% turnout (vs. 50.0% in the county).

Emergency services

Police
The Bergenfield Police Department provides police services to the Borough of Bergenfield. As of 2010, there are a total of 46 sworn officers in the department, 8 civilian telecommunicators, and three civilian Records Bureau employees.

The force is responsible for all aspects of policing in the borough, including responding to fire and medical emergency calls. Each patrol car is equipped with a first aid kit, oxygen tank, and an Automated external defibrillator.

Fire
Started in 1905, the Bergenfield Fire Department (BFD) has three independent fire companies and a career staff.

Ambulance
The Bergenfield Volunteer Ambulance Corps, Inc. (BVAC) was formed in 1941 as the "Bergenfield Volunteer Firemen's Ambulance Corps." Renamed the "Bergenfield Volunteer Ambulance Corps, Inc." and established as an organization independent of the Bergenfield Fire Department in 1981, BVAC is located at 1 Froelich Street in Bergenfield. The BVAC is a volunteer independent public emergency medical service. As such, they do not bill for services. BVAC is funded by donations from the public as well as limited funding from the borough.

The corps provides basic life support, and is staffed by certified emergency medical technicians. BVAC has four ambulances, one first response SUV, and one EMS Support Unit. Dispatching is provided by the Bergenfield Police Department's 9-1-1 center.

The primary jurisdiction of the BVAC is the Borough of Bergenfield, but the corps also responds to requests for mutual-aid from the neighboring First Aid Squads of Dumont, New Milford, and Teaneck.

The BVAC is a member of the New Jersey State First Aid Council.

Education
Students in pre-kindergarten through twelfth grade are educated by the Bergenfield Public Schools. As of the 2020–21 school year, the district, comprised of seven schools, had an enrollment of 3,666 students and 283.0 classroom teachers (on an FTE basis), for a student–teacher ratio of 13.0:1. Schools in the district (with 2020–21 enrollment data from the National Center for Education Statistics) are 
Franklin Elementary School with 345 students in grades K-5, 
Hoover Elementary School with 261 students in grades K-5, 
Jefferson Elementary School with 278 students in grades K-5, 
Lincoln Elementary School with 410 students in grades PreK-5, 
Washington Elementary School with 300 students in grades K-5, 
Roy W. Brown Middle School with 855 students in grades 6-8 and 
Bergenfield High School with 1,203 students in grades 9-12.

Public school students from the borough, and all of Bergen County, are eligible to attend the secondary education programs offered by the Bergen County Technical Schools, which include the Bergen County Academies in Hackensack, and the Bergen Tech campus in Teterboro or Paramus. The district offers programs on a shared-time or full-time basis, with admission based on a selective application process and tuition covered by the student's home school district.

Transportation

Roads and highways

Main roads include Washington Avenue, Main Street, Prospect Avenue, River Edge Road and New Bridge Road.

Public transportation
NJ Transit bus service is available to and from the Port Authority Bus Terminal in Midtown Manhattan on the 166, 167 routes and to the George Washington Bridge Bus Station on the 186 route; and to other New Jersey communities served on the 753, 756 and 772 routes.

Saddle River Tours / Ameribus provides service to the George Washington Bridge Bus Station on route 11C.

Until 1959, the New York Central Railroad operated passenger service through the borough on the West Shore Railroad. Service operated north along the Hudson River to Albany, New York, and points west; and south to Weehawken Terminal.

Community
Bergenfield is one of a growing number of districts to form a SID (Special Improvement District). Bergenfield's Special Improvement District stretches a mile along Washington Avenue from Teaneck to Dumont has been promoting the local businesses for several years. Its mission is to inform people about Bergenfield's shopping district and its over 50 international restaurants and food stores within one mile.

Mayors
Arvin Amatorio, 2020–present
Norman Schmelz, 2013–2020.
Timothy J. Driscoll 2008 to 2013.
Richard J. Bohan 2004-2007.
Robert C. Rivas 1999 to 2003.
Kevin M. Clancy 1996-1998
Charles F. McDowell, Jr. 1992-1995
Robert J. Gallione, Jr. 1988-1991
Charles J. O'Dowd 1968-1971 and 1980-1987.
James F. Lodato 1976-1979.
William D. Armitage  1975
H. Alfred Struhs 1974
Walter S. Rosenbaum 1972-1973
William J. Patterson 1963-1967
Hugh M. Gillson 1960-1963
Edward C. Meyer 1954 to 1959.
Henry W. Theis 1946 to 1953.
Leonard Lindstrom 1931.
Charles A. Grabowski 1926.
T. J. Prime 1918 to 1922.
George Breisacher (1865–1934) 1912 to 1913.
Walter Cornelius Christie (1863–1941) 1897 to 1891. He was the founder and the second mayor of Bergenfield, New Jersey.

Notable people

People who were born in, residents of, or otherwise closely associated with Bergenfield include:

 Jack Antonoff (born 1984), singer, songwriter, and record producer, as well as guitarist of Fun
 Harry Basil, stand-up comic, actor in Peggy Sue Got Married and film director
 Chris Brantley (born 1970), former NFL wide receiver
 Walter Christie (1863–1941), founder of Bergenfield who was the borough's second mayor in 1897
 Pierce H. Deamer Jr. (1907–1986), politician who served in the New Jersey General Assembly and New Jersey Senate
 Al Di Meola (born 1954), jazz fusion and Latin jazz guitarist, composer and record producer
 Frank Eufemia (born 1959), Major League Baseball, pitcher
 Ella Fajardo (born 2003), point guard who plays for the Fairleigh Dickinson Knights women's basketball team and has represented the Philippine national team in international competitions
 Thom Fitzgerald (born 1968), filmmaker, The Hanging Garden, 3 Needles
 George Gately (1928–2001), creator of the Heathcliff comic strip
 Bob Gaudio (born 1942), from the Four Seasons
 Bob Guccione (born 1930), founder and former owner of Penthouse
 Eugene Korn (born 1947), Orthodox rabbi who has focused on Jewish-Christian relations
 David Lat (born 1975), blogger
 Jimmy Lydon (born 1923), who played Henry Aldrich in the movies, honored in the Bergenfield Hall of Fame
 Produce Pete (born 1945), grocer, chef and celebrity spokesperson
 Tom Reilly (born 1959), actor who played Bobby Nelson on CHiPs
 Beatrice Schroeder Rose (1922–2014), author, composer, harpist and teacher, who was the principal harpist of the Houston Symphony for 31 years
 Rabbi Zvi Sobolofsky, Rosh Yeshiva at Yeshiva University
 Floyd James Thompson (1933–2002), America's longest held prisoner of war
 McCoy Tyner (1938–2020), jazz pianist known for his work with the John Coltrane Quartet and a long solo career
 Ron Villone (born 1970), Major League Baseball relief pitcher who played for 12 MLB teams, including for the New York Yankees in the 2006 season
 Jacklyn Zeman (born 1953), actress who has played Barbara "Bobbie" Spencer on General Hospital since 1977

References

Sources
 Municipal Incorporations of the State of New Jersey (according to Counties) prepared by the Division of Local Government, Department of the Treasury (New Jersey); December 1, 1958.
 Clayton, W. Woodford; and Nelson, William. History of Bergen and Passaic Counties, New Jersey, with Biographical Sketches of Many of its Pioneers and Prominent Men. Philadelphia: Everts and Peck, 1882.
 Harvey, Cornelius Burnham (ed.), Genealogical History of Hudson and Bergen Counties, New Jersey. New York: New Jersey Genealogical Publishing Co., 1900.
 Van Valen, James M. History of Bergen County, New Jersey. New York: New Jersey Publishing and Engraving Co., 1900.
 Westervelt, Frances A. (Frances Augusta), 1858–1942, History of Bergen County, New Jersey, 1630–1923, Lewis Historical Publishing Company, 1923.

External links

 Bergenfield Borough official website
 Bergenfield Special Improvement District

 
1894 establishments in New Jersey
Borough form of New Jersey government
Boroughs in Bergen County, New Jersey
Populated places established in 1894